Anima is a Turkish alternative rock band formed in 2000 by Ceylan Ertem, Ekin Cengizkan, Murat Çopur, and Tuncay Korkmaz. The group is particularly known for their covers on stage of artists / bands like Radiohead, Björk, Massive Attack, Pink Floyd, Janis Joplin, Jimi Hendrix, and Jamiroquai.

Although the band was disbanded in 2007, Cengizkan and Çopur still works for Ertem's solo career while Korkmaz is retired from active musical career.

Albums
Animasal (Sony BMG) (2006)
 Fa Minör Mızıka
 Yağmurla Gelen
 Yolgezer
 El Kadar Bir Kız
 Kızılderili Ruhu
 Joker
 Heidi
 Bilmece
 Kuklalar
 Elveda
 Saygıdeğer Düşman
 Sona İki Kala
 Bana Sorma
 Son Şarkı

External links
 animasal.com, official web site of the band
 animasalfan.com, fan site, news, forums

Turkish rock music groups